The Americas Zone was one of the three regional zones of the 1979 Davis Cup.

13 teams entered the Americas Zone in total, with 6 teams entering the North & Central America Zone and 7 teams entering the South America Zone. The winner of each sub-zone advanced to the Americas Inter-Zonal Final, with the winner going on to compete in the Inter-Zonal Zone against the winners of the Eastern Zone and Europe Zone.

The United States defeated Colombia in the North & Central America Zone final, and Argentina defeated Chile in the South America Zone final. In the Americas Inter-Zonal Final the United States defeated Argentina and progressed to the Inter-Zonal Zone.

North & Central America Zone

Preliminary rounds

Draw

First round
Caribbean/West Indies vs. Venezuela

Qualifying round
Mexico vs. Canada

Colombia vs. Venezuela

Main draw

Draw

Semifinals
Mexico vs. Colombia

Final
United States vs. Colombia

South America Zone

Preliminary rounds

Draw

First round
Ecuador vs. Peru

Bolivia vs. Brazil

Qualifying round
Ecuador vs. Argentina

Brazil vs. Uruguay

Main draw

Draw

Semifinals
Argentina vs. Brazil

Final
Argentina vs. Chile

Americas Inter-Zonal Final
United States vs. Argentina

References

External links
Davis Cup official website

Davis Cup Americas Zone
Americas
Davis Cup
Davis Cup
Davis Cup